Louis-Léon de Brancas (3 July 1733 – 9 October 1824), 3rd duc de Lauraguais, 6th duc de Villars, was a French general and author, and a member of the French Academy of Sciences.

He was the son of Louis de Brancas-Villars and Adelaide-Genevieve d'O, Marquise de Franconville.  He married Elisabeth-Pauline de Gand, Princess d'Isenghien, in 1755.

References

1733 births
1824 deaths
18th-century French writers
18th-century French male writers
French generals
Members of the French Academy of Sciences
Members of the Chamber of Peers of the Bourbon Restoration
Burials at Père Lachaise Cemetery